Sonam Lama is an Indian politician and monk in Sikkim. He is the State Minister RDD, Cooperative Depart of Sikkim

Political career
Sonam Lama stood as the candidate of Sikkim Krantikari Morcha (SKM) from Sangha constituency in the 2014 Sikkim Legislative Assembly election. He won and beat the candidate of ruling party Sikkim Democratic Front (SDF).

In December 2015, 7 SKM Members of Sikkim Legislative Assembly defected to the ruling party SDF, but 2 other MLAs of SKM, Sonam Lama and Kunga Nima Lepcha stayed with their party.

Sonam Lama stood as the SKM candidate from Sangha again. He won the seat and beat the SDF candidate by 26.52% margin. He was appointed to the Minister of Rural Management & Development, Panchayati Raj & Cooperative and Ecclesiastical affairs in P. S. Golay Cabinet.

Electoral records 
 Sikkim Legislative Assembly election

References

Living people
Sikkim MLAs 2014–2019
Sikkim Krantikari Morcha politicians
People from Gangtok district
Sikkim MLAs 2019–2024
Year of birth missing (living people)